Huwala (sing. Huwali هولي) also collectively referred to as Bani Huwala, is a blanket term usually used to refer to Iranian Arabs who originate from the Arabian Peninsula, initially migrating in the 13th and 14th century from Iraq and Arabia and intermixed with indigenous population of older Arabic background. Such migrations continued till around the 17th or 18th century to the area which is now the Hormozgan Province and Fars Province, mainly Bandar Abbas, Qishm and the mainland near Bandar Lengeh. The Huwala follows Sunni Islam, as opposed the majority Persian Twelver Shia and similar to Sunni Peninsular Arabs. Most of the Huwala have remigrated back to the Arabian peninsula between 1850-1900s. The imposition of restrictive economic policies by Reza Shah in the 1930s led to the migration of most of the Huwala back to the Arabian peninsula. 

Most of the Huwala Arabs settled in Iran for a period of time and intermarried with the indigenous Achomi and have adopted their language, hence they are sometimes called Ajam by the peninsular Arabs .

Etymology 

Huwala (Arabic: الهولة), is a plural Arabic term for Huwali (Arabic: هولي), which is a word derived from the Arabic verb Huwwal (Arabic: حوّل) which means "to change over". A book by Dejanirah Couto and Rui Loureiro into Portuguese interactions in Hormuz defines Huwala as "migrant Arabs".

Author Lawrence G. Potter defines Huwala as

History 
In the 18th century, the Arab Al Qasimi tribal affiliation, once a major maritime power, took control of southern Iranian coasts and islands around Bandar Lengeh. In 1779 the Iranian Zand dynasty acknowledged a fait accompli and recognized a Qasimi as local ruler (farmandar) of Bandar Lengeh. At about the same time the Zands allowed the British East India Company to establish its residency and presence in Bushehr. The Qasimis remained in control of Bandar Lengeh and surrounding region until 1887, when they were defeated by the British in their self proclaimed “anti-piracy” campaign which Emirati based scholars (including current Sharjah ruler Sultan bin Muhammad Al-Qasimi) argue was a myth used to dominate trade routes to India and Iraq. The Qasimis retreated to the southern coast of the Gulf, and their Iranian domains reverted to nominal rule by Tehran.

The Achomi (Larestani) Iranian population lived on the coast alongside the Qasimis. They prospered under Al Qasimi rule as merchants in pearl trading. Author John W. Limbert argues that in response to Reza Shah Pahlavi's  policies of centralization, conscription, civil status reforms, and, most important, the forced unveiling of women led to many of the Achomis to follow the Qasimis back to the Arabian Peninsula, further mixing the Huwala's Arabic and Persian roots.

Culture 
The re-migration of the Arabs and some Persians to the Arabian Peninsula led to the transfer of the technology of windcatchers. Windcatchers (called Baadgir in Persian and Barjil in Arabic) is an ancient air-conditioning system that cools the airs inside living quarters in the hot and dry climate of the Iranian plateau and the Arabian peninsula. The Bastakis established Bastakiya in Dubai mirroring their original hometown of Bastak in southern Iran. The windcatcher designs today decorates many areas in Eastern Arabia such as Awadhiya in Bahrain (established by Huwala who named the region Awadhiya in honor of their hometown Awadh - now known as Evaz), Bastakiya in Dubai, and Souq Waqif in Doha by the Lari's. The Huwala established the many iconic Eastern Arabian cultural buildings seen including Qasr al-Hosn in Abu Dhabi which was designed by Mohammed al Bastaki. Alongside the Qassimi maritime power, the Huwala windcatchers and Baghlah which formed the maritime unit of the Qassimi today formulated the majority of Eastern Arabian culture icons.  

Mahyawa, a tangy Iranian cuisine fish sauce was also introduced by the Huwala to the Arabian peninsula and many associate the sauce with the Huwala.

Identity and origin 

The Huwala and the Achomi (also called Larestani) share very similarities that have led scholars to even consider them sometimes as the same population. Both are Sunni Muslims and both may refer to themselves as Khodemooni, a colloquial Larestani word that means “among ourselves”, “casual”, “insider”, or just “us” which was used to differentiate them from the majority Shia Persian speakers and Sunni Arabic speakers on both sides of the gulf. However, the tribal Huwala communities distinguish themselves from the Larestani speakers because they have maintained a purer Arabic tongue and culture. The Achomi's language is a southern Iranian language with dialects such as Gerashi and Bastaki. Achomi is an endangered language as its usage has declined tremendously as most young people speak either Arabic or Persian. Both the Huwala and the Achomi lived in the subtropical region of southern Iran. This area was largely neglected by the central Iranian government as most of its inhabitants were nomads.

The Huwala seem to have a different origin to other Iranian Arabs such as Khuzestanis, according to scholarly consensus and Huwala's own origin narrative, they immigrated from numerous areas of Eastern Arabia, some from Tarout near Al-Qatif, Bahrain and the Qatari peninsula and other areas of Eastern Arabia. Mainly Sunni Arab maritime families moved due to economic reasons and famine, settling in Southern Iran at different times throughout the 17th to 19th century. They settled on the coasts of Southern Iran, marrying into local Achomi or Larestani Persians due to their shared Sunni denomination. Many Huwala are dual lingual, speaking both Arabic and Persian throughout their history. 

Modern Huwala families have more Arab than Persian ancestry, many families speaking a Gulf dialect of Arabic in Iran before the forced partial Persianization by the Pahlavi Dynasty discouraging and outright banning Arabic being taught in their areas and enacting policies that supported the break up and banning of tribal identification. Many Huwala families were forced to drop their Arab surnames in favor of city based surnames when signing up for schools or dealing with the Iranian state. These policies encouraged many Huwala families to move back to the Arab states of the Gulf, many moving to the UAE, Qatar and Bahrain, who offered them refuge and citizenship.

Huwala families

Al Qasimi   
Al Marzooqi 
Al Harm
Al Majid
Ahli
Al Ansari
Al Janahi
Al Musallami
Al Bastaki
Abbasi
Fardan
Al Awadhi
Galadari  
Gargash  
Falaknaz  
Al Gurg  
Rostomani  
Al Hammadi
Khoory
Al Emadi
Al Kooheji
Shaibani
Al Rais
Al Faris
Al Farisi
Al Abdouli
Belshalat
Al Huwali<ref 
Al Emadi 
Yaqoobi
Bucheeri
Sadeghi

See also 
 Arab-Persians
 Ajam of Bahrain
 Ajam of Kuwait
 History of Bahrain
 History of Kuwait
 Culture of Eastern Arabia

References

External links 
 Huwala DNA Project

History of Eastern Arabia
Bahraini people of Iranian descent
Kuwaiti people of Iranian descent
Persian communities outside Iran
African diaspora
Iranian diaspora in the Middle East